Bordj T'har  is a town and commune in Jijel Province, Algeria. According to the 1998 census it has a population of 4893.

References

Communes of Jijel Province